The Taihang Mountains are a mountain range in China.

Taihang may also refer to:
Tai Hang, area in Hong Kong Island
Tai Hang (constituency), the political constituency of the above area
Tai Hang (Tai Po), area in the New Territories, Hong Kong
Shenyang WS-10, a Chinese military aircraft turbofan engine